Othman Al-Hasanat is a Jordanian footballer who played as an attacking midfielder until he retired and became a futsal coach and football coach.

Othman has a brother named Rateb, former player of Al-Wehdat.

References
 Jordanian Coaches Participate in the Asian Futsal Training Cycle 
 Interview With Othman Al-Hasanat

External links
 
 Al-Hasanat on Facebook

Living people
Jordanian footballers
Jordan international footballers
Jordanian Pro League managers
1980 births
Association football midfielders
Al-Faisaly SC players
Al-Jazeera (Jordan) players
Shabab Al-Ordon Club players
Al-Baqa'a Club players
Jordanian Pro League players